The 1983 Intercontinental Cup was an association football match played on 11 December 1983 between Hamburger SV, winners of the 1982–83 European Cup, and Grêmio, winners of the 1983 Copa Libertadores. The match was played at the National Stadium in Tokyo. Renato Portaluppi was named as man of the match.

Venue

Match details

See also
1982–83 European Cup
1983 Copa Libertadores

References

1983–84 in European football
1983 in South American football
1983 in Japanese football
1983
Hamburger SV matches
Grêmio Foot-Ball Porto Alegrense matches
1983
1983 in Brazilian football
1983–84 in German football
Sports competitions in Tokyo
December 1983 sports events in Asia
1983 in Tokyo
1983 in association football